Toshiko–Mariano Quartet (in West Side) is a jazz album by pianist Toshiko Akiyoshi and alto saxophonist Charlie Mariano and was recorded in Tokyo in 1963 and released on the Nippon Columbia/Takt label.  This album is related to the similar RCA Mariano/Akiyoshi release, East and West but is not to be confused with the 1961 Candid recording, The Toshiko–Mariano Quartet.

Track listing
LP side 1
"Tonight" (Bernstein, Sondheim)  
"Something's Coming" (Bernstein, Sondheim)  
"America" (Bernstein, Sondheim)  
"Maria" (Bernstein, Sondheim)  
LP side 2
"Cool" (Bernstein, Sondheim)  
"Plaisir d'amour" (Martini) 
"Malagueña" (Lecuona) 
"Oleo" (Rollins)

Personnel
Toshiko Akiyoshi – piano
Charlie Mariano – alto saxophone
Albert Heath – drums 
Gene Cherico – bass

Similar RCA release
A slightly different album titled East and West (Toshiko Akiyoshi and Charlie Mariano) was released by RCA / Victor Japan (BVCJ-7420 and RVL-5518 and PG-1501) that included the same five West Side Story tracks but added two different tracks in place of the three non-West Side Story tracks.  
  
 "Haru No Umi" (春の海)
 "Stone Garden of Ryoan Temple" (竜安寺の石庭)  
Personnel on "Stone Garden of Ryoan Temple":
 Charlie Mariano – alto saxophone
 Sadao Watanabe (渡辺貞夫) – flute, alto saxophone
 Masabumi Kikuchi (菊地雅章) – piano
 Masanaga Harada (原田政長) – bass 
 Masahiko Togashi (富樫雅彦) – drums

References / External links

BVCJ-7420
[ Allmusic]
NIPPON Columbia Records NS-1001

 

1963 albums
Charlie Mariano albums
Toshiko Akiyoshi albums
Nippon Columbia albums